How I'm Feeling Now (stylized in all caps on physical releases, in all lowercase on streaming services) is the fourth studio album by English singer and songwriter Charli XCX, released on 15 May 2020. Released eight months after her previous LP, Charli (2019), the album was conceived in the span of six weeks during the COVID-19 lockdown in a "do it yourself" collaborative process with her fans. Charli XCX, A. G. Cook and BJ Burton served as the album's executive producers.

How I'm Feeling Now was preceded by the singles "Forever", "Claws" and "I Finally Understand", which were met with positive reviews from critics. The album received critical acclaim and was noted for its fusion of pop songwriting and experimental electronic production. It debuted at number 33 on the UK Albums Chart, moving 2,145 units. It was shortlisted for the 2020 Mercury Prize.

Background 
On 13 September 2019, Charli XCX released her third studio album, Charli. To celebrate the one month anniversary of Charli, Charli XCX announced that the album would not receive a deluxe edition and that she already began work on a new project. Soon after, on 24 November 2019, Charli XCX announced on Twitter that she was planning to record two new albums in 2020, with plans to release both by 2021. On 18 March 2020, in response to the COVID-19 pandemic, Charli XCX began a self-isolating livestream series featuring artists such as Diplo, Clairo and Rita Ora.

On April 3, 2020, a PDF file containing album details was allegedly leaked on Reddit and LanaBoards. It was initially perceived as a prank, but it gained validity when the file was the first hint of the album title, and Charli and Atlantic Records retweeted the image of the file after it was released by FckyeahCharli on Twitter.

On 6 April 2020, Charli XCX announced through a public Zoom call with fans that she would be working on a new album in self-isolation, with the tentative title How I'm Feeling Now. In the call, Charli XCX stated "The nature of this album is going to be very indicative of the times just because I'm only going to be able to use the tools I have at my fingertips to create all music, artwork, videos everything." The entire project would be collaborative with her fans, using Zoom calls to share demos and text conversations with producers and ask fan input on single releases, song ideas, and artwork. She also said in the stream that A. G. Cook and BJ Burton were among the people she was working with. During the Zoom announcement, Charli XCX set a release date of 15 May 2020.

On 30 April 2020, Charli XCX announced on Twitter the song titles that were currently considered for the track list and that the yet unreleased fan-favorite "Party 4 U" would be on the album as well. The full tracklist and album cover were revealed on 13 May 2020, prior to the album's release.

Music and theme
This is Charli XCX's "quarantine album." Due to the worldwide COVID-19 pandemic, she recorded the entire project inside her house, with the support of her friends and producers online. Lyrically, Charli referred to this album as her "most optimistic project to date," and she has asked fans to submit her beats and assist her with other projects. She has also indicated that she will be livestream her production process for anyone who wants to watch. On April 7, Charli stated that the album's tone and much of the lyrics will be about her relationship with her boyfriend Huck Kwong. On May 13, Charli discussed the album on Instagram, writing: "I can’t believe How I'm Feeling Now is out this Friday!! this whole process has been so incredible & I’m so happy you’ve all been such a crucial part of the creative process! co-writing verse 2 of “anthems” on insta live, making the “forever” video together from all your amazing clips, your green screen versions of “claws”, the remixes & edits you made using the stems I dropped (& playing them on my Apple Music show!), deciding which photos to use as a basis for the artworks, collecting your own amazing artworks you’ve been making, helping me with production decisions & so much more... i couldn’t have made this album without you! howimfeelingnowinbox@gmail.com has been bombarded with wild beats, artwork & ideas & it’s been so inspiring going through it all. I’ve discovered FARCE, Whyetc, BVXTR, Jikuroux & so many new and v talented producers/writers. i’ve also been lucky enough to collaborate with visual artists like Naked Cherry, Polygon 1993 & lots of others. This process has introduced me to new work & I’m so grateful for that. [...] I can’t believe this album is nearly out! We did it! 🤍".An electronic pop, experimental pop and hyperpop album, How I'm Feeling Now is a continuation of the signature sound Charli XCX has specialized in since the 2016 release of EP Vroom Vroom, in which she embraced the futuristic pop music of Sophie and other musicians related to the PC Music label, a style that has been variously referred to as "bubblegum bass" and as the previously mentioned "hyper-pop". Kitty Empire of The Guardian described the album's music as "acrylic, outre, influencer club-pop," which "aggressively foregrounds its own artifice." Varietys Jem Aswad characterised the production as "a shape-shifting mesh of shimmering synthesizers, driving bass, hard beats, swarms of voices and crashing mechanical sounds." Although it is characterised as a formal album, critics have noted that How I'm Feeling Now is closer in style to her 2017 mixtapes Number 1 Angel and Pop 2, as it is looser and more experimental than her self-titled album. Charli XCX herself has described the album as "Pop 2s frantic emo younger sister." Writing for Paste, Austin Jones felt: "Though the glitchy sound art and experimental edges of Pop 2 are missed, Charli deftly revives the techniques of the '90s Eurotrance scene that proved formative for her musical development."

Release and promotion 
On April 10, Charli uploaded additional song samples for the album dubbed "Claws," "Enemy," "7 Years," and "Detonate." She then asked through Twitter which of those four songs she should release, and announced that "Claws" won and will be released next week. The song was released on April 23. On the same day (April 10th), she released a new episode of her radio show, The Candy Shop, in which she played two new demos, the first being "Breathe Out," and the other being an unnamed demo called "KM TM Demo" with production by Sega Bodega, the song is speculated to be called "Asleep." On April 15, she uploaded a picture of different music plans, such as writing over a Palmistry beat (working title as "Where U At", ended up being I Finally Understand), a Sega Bodega beat, an A.G. Cook one, as well as a Dylan Brady and Nico one. Nömak was also on the list but erased out.

Singles 
On 7 April 2020, Charli shared snippets of a song called "Forever" on social media. On 9 April 2020, she announced that "Forever" would be released as the lead single off the album at 11:30 PM PST and premiere on the BBC Radio 1 with Annie Mac podcast. "Forever"s official artwork was created by American artist Seth Bogart. Two additional artworks were also released for "Forever", by French artist Regards Coupables and American singer-songwriter Caroline Polachek, respectively. The official music video for "Forever", featuring clips sent in from fans, was released on 17 April 2020. On 11 April 2020 she announced that she had chosen the next single, to be titled either "Claws" or "I Like". On 14 April 2020 she announced that she had settled on "Claws" as the song title. The official music video for "Claws" was remotely directed and edited by Charlotte Rutherford, and featured Aitchison's boyfriend Huck Kwong. It premiered on 1 May 2020. On 2 May 2020, Charli unveiled that she would release a third single before the album release titled "I Finally Understand" the following week. It premiered on 7 May 2020. On the day of the album's release, "Enemy" was released as a promotional single from the album.

Tour 
In August 2021, Charli announced a three special shows, branded the How I'm Feeling Now Tour. The singer visited Los Angeles on 27 September 2021, at The Masonic Lodge; New York City on 1 October 2021, at La Poisson Rouge; and her home of London on 24 October 2021, at Lafayette.

Critical reception

How I'm Feeling Now was met with widespread critical acclaim. At Metacritic, which assigns a normalised rating out of 100 to reviews from professional publications, the album received an average score of 82, based on 16 reviews.

Neil McCormick gave the album a perfect 5-star rating in his review for The Daily Telegraph, opining that it "has a directness, immediacy and intimacy that has eluded her before," while The Faders Salvatore Maicki called it "indisputably cohesive and honest" in its exploration of emotional extremes. Hannah Mylrea of NME called it a "glorious, experimental collection" and praised Aitchison's "knack for a killer pop hook" despite the "crunching production." Similarly, Clash journalist Megan Warrender commended her "futuristic, unpredictable sound and penchant for an irresistible pop hook" as well as her display of "tenderness and vulnerability." Tom Hull gave the album a B-plus and said that recording at home due to quarantine "doesn't allow her the usual kitchen sink pop production, but she cranks the synths up loud enough it doesn't matter."

The album was shortlisted for the Mercury Prize in 2020, losing to Michael Kiwanuka's Kiwanuka.

Retrospectively, in April 2022, Clashs Ruby Carter characterized the album as a "relic of an era", a "masterpiece of vulnerability" and a "sign of the times".

Rankings

Track listing

Notes
  indicates an additional producer.
 "C2.0" incorporates lyrics from "Click" and contains vocals from Kim Petras.
 All track titles are stylised in all lowercase letters.

Personnel
Credits adapted from the album's liner notes.

Musicians

 Charlotte Aitchison – all vocals
 A. G. Cook – drum programming , synthesizers , programming , xylophone , bass , drums , additional drum and synthesizer programming , background vocals 
 Dijon – drum programming and synthesizers 
 BJ Burton – drum programming , synthesizers , Moog , bass , drums 
 Dylan Brady – bass , drum programming , drums , synthesizers , softsynths , harsh noise 
 Eli Teplin – keyboards 
 Jim-E Stack – Roland JV-1080 
 Benjamin Keating – background vocals, bass, drum programming, drums, synthesizer 
 Kim Petras – additional vocals 
 Jaan Umru – bass, drum programming, synth sound design, "vibes" 

Technical

 Charlotte Aitchison – executive production, recording , engineering 
 BJ Burton – executive production, engineering , vocal production 
 A. G. Cook – executive production, engineering , vocal production 
 Stuart Hawkes – mastering
 Geoff Swan – mixing
 Niko Battistini – assistant mix engineering
 Dylan Brady – vocal production 
 Benjamin Keating – vocal production 
 Jaan Umru – vocal processing

Charts

Release history

References

External links

2020 albums
Charli XCX albums
Cultural responses to the COVID-19 pandemic
Impact of the COVID-19 pandemic on the music industry
Albums recorded in a home studio
Albums produced by A. G. Cook
Albums produced by BJ Burton
Albums produced by Dylan Brady
Albums about the COVID-19 pandemic
Atlantic Records albums
Asylum Records albums
Hyperpop albums